Lawless is a two-part British television thriller miniseries, first broadcast on ITV from 8 to 9 November 2004. Written by Chris Lang, directed by Roger Gartland and starring Trevor Eve, Orla Brady and David Calder, Lawless follows the story of DI John Paxton, who begins to question his job when a murderer walks free from court because of a legal technicality. The two-part miniseries was commissioned in 2003, along with another two-part miniseries written by Lang, Amnesia. The miniseries gathered good viewing figures, with the first part watched by 7.17 million, and the second by 5.65 million. Unlike Amnesia, the series has never been released on DVD.

Production
Trevor Eve said of his role in the series; "In one scene I had to drag myself out of the Tyne. They'd [the producers] selected a particularly filthy dockside for the purpose, so that wasn't particularly enjoyable. I have to say the novelty of stunts and things like that has gone for me. The driving, I like. I did a lot of the driving stunts myself and there's a lot of racing around Newcastle. But the jumping off the bridge – the stuntman did that one! The beard comes off in a vain attempt to not look like the person the police are looking for. I didn't really grow the beard for a part, but I did Troy last year and when I got back to the UK, I literally went straight on to set and they started to shave off the beard, but then realised that underneath my skin was white – whereas the rest of my face was quite tanned. So we decided to keep it rather than have to wear loads of make-up. I hate shaving anyway, so I'm glad it's proved a popular look."

Cast
 Trevor Eve — DI John Paxton
 Orla Brady — DC Liz Bird
 David Calder — DCI Pete Chambers
 Ralph Brown — Phil Howell
 Dermot Crowley — Bob Allard
 Darrell D'Silva — Mark Easton
 Tracy Gillman — Amy Graves
 Paul Brennen — Jack Harris
 Jacqueline King — Kate Chambers
 Christopher Connel — Patrick Kinney
 Danielle Lydon — Louise Paxton

Episodes

References

External links
 

2004 British television series debuts
2004 British television series endings
2000s British crime drama television series
2000s British television miniseries
British thriller television series
ITV television dramas
Television series by All3Media
English-language television shows
Television shows set in Newcastle upon Tyne
Television shows set in Tyne and Wear